This is a list of events in animation in 2018.

Events

January
 January 7: The first episode of Pop Team Epic airs.
 January 22: Minnie Mouse receives a star at the Hollywood Walk of Fame.
 January 30: Nick Jr. celebrates its 30th anniversary.

February
 February 26: The first episode of Final Space airs.

March
 March 3: 38th Golden Raspberry Awards
 Sony Pictures Animation's The Emoji Movie wins a record four Razzie awards, including Worst Picture, becoming the first animated film to win it.
 March 4: 90th Academy Awards: 
 Dear Basketball by Glen Keane wins the Academy Award for Best Animated Short Film.
 Coco by Walt Disney Pictures and Pixar wins the Academy Award for Best Animated Feature and Academy Award for Best Original Song. 
 March 25: The Simpsons episode "3 Scenes Plus a Tag from a Marriage" first airs, in which the couch gag is animated by Bill Plympton, the sixth time he has done so.
 March 29: John Kricfalusi is accused by animators Robyn Byrd and Katie Rice of having sexually harassed and groomed them when they were underage.

April
 April 27: The Simpsons beats Gunsmoke's record of being the longest-running American primetime TV series.

May
 May 11: John Kricfalusi issues a personal explanation and apology about the sexual assault allegations against him, though he denies some of the claims.
 May 13: The Simpsons episode "Throw Grampa from the Dane" premieres, where the family travels to Denmark.

June
 June 3: The first episode of Fancy Nancy airs.
 June 11: Nina Paley's animated feature film Seder-Masochism premiers, which analyses the Book of Exodus and evolution of Judaism as a patriarchal religion.
 June 18: The first episode of Big City Greens airs.

July
 July 7: The first episode of Summer Camp Island airs.
 July 8: Incredibles 2 surpasses Finding Dory as the highest-grossing animated film in the United States and Canada, with a domestic box-office gross of $500 million.

August
 August 17: The first episode of Disenchantment airs on Netflix.
 August 23: The first episode of Wolfoo airs on YouTube.

September
 September 3: Adventure Time airs its final episode on Cartoon Network, after an 8-year run.
 September 7: Kevin R. Adams and Joe Ksander's Next Gen premiers and becomes the first full-length animated feature film to be released exclusively on Netflix.
 September 21: The first episode of Hilda airs on Netflix.

October
 October 1: The first episode of Bluey premieres on ABC Kids to universal critical acclaim.
 October 19: The rest of the first season of Hilda airs on Netflix.
 October 26: Adi Shankar states in an interview with IndieWire that the character Apu Nahasapeemapetilon will leave The Simpsons following controversy over him potentially being a negative and racially offensive stereotype.
 October 29: The Simpsons executive producer Al Jean states that "Adi Shankar does not speak for our show".

November
 November 21: 
 Ralph Breaks the Internet is released, being the first theatrical Walt Disney Animation Studios sequel since The Rescuers Down Under in 1990. 
 Let's Go Luna airs its first episode on PBS Kids.

December
 December 12: Cinderella and Hair Piece: A Film for Nappyheaded People are added to the National Film Registry.

Awards
 Academy Award for Best Animated Feature: Spider-Man: Into the Spider-Verse
 Academy Award for Best Animated Short Film: Bao
 American Cinema Editors Award for Best Edited Animated Feature Film: Spider-Man: Into the Spider-Verse
 Annecy International Animated Film Festival Cristal du long métrage: Funan
 Annie Award for Best Animated Feature: Spider-Man: Into the Spider-Verse
 Annie Award for Best Animated Feature — Independent: Mirai
 Asia Pacific Screen Award for Best Animated Feature Film: Rezo
 BAFTA Award for Best Animated Film: Spider-Man: Into the Spider-Verse
 César Award for Best Animated Film: Dilili in Paris
 Chicago Film Critics Association Award for Best Animated Film: Spider-Man: Into the Spider-Verse
 Critics' Choice Movie Award for Best Animated Feature: Spider-Man: Into the Spider-Verse
 Dallas–Fort Worth Film Critics Association Award for Best Animated Film: Isle of Dogs
 European Film Award for Best Animated Feature Film: Another Day of Life
 Florida Film Critics Circle Award for Best Animated Film: Mirai
 Golden Globe Award for Best Animated Feature Film: Spider-Man: Into the Spider-Verse
 Golden Reel Award for Animated Feature Film: Spider-Man: Into the Spider-Verse
 Goya Award for Best Animated Film: Another Day of Life
 Hollywood Animation Award: Incredibles 2
 Japan Academy Film Prize for Animation of the Year: The Night Is Short, Walk On Girl
 Kids' Choice Award for Favorite Animated Movie: Incredibles 2
 Los Angeles Film Critics Association Award for Best Animated Film: Spider-Man: Into the Spider-Verse
 Mainichi Film Award for Best Animation Film: Okko's Inn
 National Board of Review Award for Best Animated Film: Incredibles 2
 New York Film Critics Circle Award for Best Animated Film: Spider-Man: Into the Spider-Verse
 Online Film Critics Society Award for Best Animated Film: Spider-Man: Into the Spider-Verse
 Producers Guild of America Award for Best Animated Motion Picture: Spider-Man: Into the Spider-Verse
 San Diego Film Critics Society Award for Best Animated Film: Isle of Dogs
 San Francisco Film Critics Circle Award for Best Animated Feature: Spider-Man: Into the Spider-Verse
 Satellite Award for Best Animated or Mixed Media Feature: Isle of Dogs
 Saturn Award for Best Animated Film: Spider-Man: Into the Spider-Verse (note: the 2018/2019 events were combined; films released in both years were eligible)
 St. Louis Gateway Film Critics Association Award for Best Animated Film: Spider-Man: Into the Spider-Verse
 Tokyo Anime Award: In This Corner of the World and Kemono Friends
 Toronto Film Critics Association Award for Best Animated Film: Isle of Dogs
 Visual Effects Society Award for Outstanding Visual Effects in an Animated Feature: Spider-Man: Into the Spider-Verse
 Washington D.C. Area Film Critics Association Award for Best Animated Feature: Isle of Dogs

Film released

 January 1 - Enchanted Princess (Russia)
 January 6 - Love, Chunibyo & Other Delusions! Take on Me (Japan)
 January 9 - Scooby-Doo! & Batman: The Brave and the Bold (United States)
 January 11:
 The Legend of Muay Thai: 9 Satra (Thailand)
 Leo Da Vinci: Mission Mona Lisa (Italy and Poland)
 January 13 - Attack on Titan: The Roar of Awakening (Japan)
 January 19 - La Leyenda del Charro Negro (Mexico)
 January 23 - Batman: Gotham by Gaslight (United States)
 January 26 - Early Man (United Kingdom)
 February 1 - Vitello (Denmark)
 February 2:
 Allahyar and the Legend of Markhor (Pakistan)
 The Ladybug (China)
 Ploey: You Never Fly Alone (Iceland)
 February 4 - ZOOks (Belgium)
 February 8 - Up and Away (Denmark)
 February 9 - Macross Delta the Movie: Passionate Walkūre (Japan)
 February 10 - Code Geass Lelouch of the Resurrection the Movie: Rebellion Path (Japan)
 February 13 - Lego DC Comics Super Heroes: The Flash (United States)
 February 16 - Boonie Bears: The Big Shrink (China)
 February 22 - The Wolf House (Chile)
 February 23 - Mission Kathmandu: The Adventures of Nelly and Simon (Canada)
 February 24:
 Infini-T Force the Movie and Infinimals Forces (Japan)
 Maquia: When the Promised Flower Blooms (Japan)
 March 1:
 Here Comes the Grump (Mexico and United Kingdom)
 Maya the Bee: The Honey Games (Germany and Australia)
 March 3:
 Bungo Stray Dogs: Dead Apple (Japan)
 Doraemon the Movie: Nobita's Treasure Island (Japan)
 March 7 - The Stolen Princess (Ukraine)
 March 9 - Marcianos vs. Mexicanos (Mexico)
 March 17 - Pretty Cure Super Stars! (Japan)
 March 23: 
 Isle of Dogs (United States)
 Sherlock Gnomes (United Kingdom and United States)
 March 27:
 Suicide Squad: Hell to Pay (United States)
 The Swan Princess: A Royal Myztery (United States)
 March 28:
 The Testament of Sister New Devil Departures (Japan)
 White Fang (France), Luxembourg, and United States)
 April 5 - Cats and Peachtopia (China)
 April 13:
 Crayon Shin-chan: Burst Serving! Kung Fu Boys ~Ramen Rebellion~ (Japan)
 Detective Conan: Zero the Enforcer (Japan)
 Sgt. Stubby: An American Hero (United States)
 April 14 - Memoirs of a Man in Pajamas (Spain)
 April 20 - Charming (United States and Canada)
 April 21 - Liz and the Blue Bird (Japan)
 April 24 - Batman Ninja (United States and Japan)
 April 26 - Kikoriki. Deja Vu (Russia)
 May 1 - Lego DC Super Hero Girls: Super-Villain High (United States)
 May 5 - Digimon Adventure tri. Future (Japan)
 May 8 - The Boxcar Children: Surprise Island (United States)
 May 11:
 Another Day of Life (Poland, Spain, Germany, Belgium, and Hungary)
 King Shakir: Let the Game Begin (Turkey)
 May 13 - Chris the Swiss (Switzerland, Germany, Croatia, and Finland)
 May 18 - Godzilla: City on the Edge of Battle (Japan)
 May 24:
 Luis and the Aliens (Germany, Luxembourg, and Denmark)
 Sadko (Russia)
 May 26 -  Code Geass Lelouch of the Resurrection the Movie: Imperial Path (Japan)
 May 31 - Two Tails (Russia)
 June 1:
 Happy Little Submarine: 20000 Leagues under the Sea (China)
 Magic Mirror 2 (China)
 June 2 - Peacemaker Kurogane (Japan)
 June 5 - Captain Morten and the Spider Queen (Estonia, Ireland, United Kingdom, and Belgium)
 June 11: 
 Funan (France, Belgium, Luxembourg, and Cambodia)
 North of Blue (United States)
 Okko's Inn (Japan)
 Seder-Masochism (United States)
 Tito and the Birds (Brazil)
 June 12: 
 Chuck Steel: Night of the Trampires (United Kingdom)
 The Last Fiction (Iran)
 June 13 - Marnie's World (France, Germany, and Belgium)
 June 15 - Incredibles 2 (United States)
 June 22 - Pocoyo and the League of Extraordinary Super Friends (Spain)
 July 6 - Hanuman vs Mahiravana (India)
 July 7 - K: Seven Stories (Japan)
 July 12 - Underdog (South Korea)
 July 13: 
 Hotel Transylvania 3: Summer Vacation (United States)
 Pokémon the Movie: The Power of Us (Japan)
 July 20:
 Big World! Big Adventures! The Movie (United States)
 Duck Duck Goose (United States)
 Mirai (Japan)
 July 24 - The Death of Superman (United States)
 July 27 - Teen Titans Go! To the Movies (United States)
 July 31 - Lego DC Comics Super Heroes: Aquaman: Rage of Atlantis (United States)
 August 3 - My Hero Academia: Two Heroes (Japan)
 August 9: 
 Norm of the North: Keys to the Kingdom (United States)
 Ruben Brandt, Collector (Hungary)
 August 16 -  Wheely: Fast & Hilarious (Malaysia)
 August 17 - Penguin Highway (Japan)
 August 18 - The Seven Deadly Sins the Movie: Prisoners of the Sky (Japan)
 August 23 - The Princess and the Dragon (Russia)
 August 25 - Non Non Biyori Vacation (Japan)
 August 28 - Scooby-Doo! and the Gourmet Ghost (United States)
 August 30 - Capt'n Sharky (Germany)
 September 1 - I Want to Eat Your Pancreas (Japan)
 September 7:
 Next Gen (Canada and United States)
 Ville Neuve (Canada)
 September 21 - Louis & Luca – Mission to the Moon (Norway)
 September 28 - Smallfoot (United States)
 September 29 - Natsume's Book of Friends the Movie (Japan)
 September 30 - Marvel Rising: Secret Warriors (United States)
 October 2 - DC Super Hero Girls: Legends of Atlantis (United States)
 October 5 - Black is Beltza (Spain)
 October 9 - Constantine City of Demons: The Movie (United States)
 October 10 - Dilili in Paris (France, Belgium, and Germany)
 October 11 - Hoffmaniada (Russia)
 October 12 - Goosebumps 2: Haunted Halloween (United States)
 October 13 - The Donkey King (Pakistan)
 October 19:
 Cattle Hill (Norway)
 Gekijōban Haikara-san ga Tōru Kōhen – Tokyo Dai Roman (Japan)
 Magical Girl Lyrical Nanoha Detonation (Japan)
 Motel Rose (South Korea)
 October 20 - Buñuel in the Labyrinth of the Turtles (Spain and Netherlands)
 November 7 - Mugworth (Spain)
 November 8 - Baba Yaga. Inception (Russia)
 November 9 - Dr. Seuss' The Grinch (United States)
 November 10:
 Anemone – Eureka Seven: Hi-Evolution 2 (Japan)
 Zokuowarimonogatari (Japan)
 November 21 - Ralph Breaks the Internet (United States)
 November 30 - The Tower (France, Norway, and Sweden)
 December - Dajjal: The Slayer and His Follower (Pakistan)
 December 4:
 Elliot the Littlest Reindeer (Canada)
 Howard Lovecraft and the Kingdom of Madness (Canada)
 December 5 - Asterix: The Secret of the Magic Potion (France)
 December 6:
 Tabaluga (Germany)
 Willy and the Guardians of the Lake (Hungary)
 December 7:
 Henchmen (Canada)
 Racetime (Canada)
 December 12 - Pachamama (Argentina and France)
 December 14:
 Dragon Ball Super: Broly (Japan)
 Spider-Man: Into the Spider-Verse (United States)
 December 16 - Strike (United Kingdom)
 December 19 - Mary Poppins Returns (United States)
 December 21: 
 Bamse and the Thunderbell (Sweden)
 The Snow Queen: Mirrorlands (Russia)
 December 25:
 Checkered Ninja (Denmark)
 Troll: The Tale of a Tail (Canada and Norway)
 December 27:
 Coconut the Little Dragon: Into the Jungle (Germany)
 The Three Heroes. The Heiress to the Throne (Russia)
 December 30 - Alibaba and the Three Golden Hair (China)
 Specific date unknown:
 Cinderella and the Secret Prince (United States)
 Eiga Shimajirō: Mahou no Shima no dai Boken (Japan)
 Hoppi Tales (Hungary)

Television series debuts

Television series endings

Deaths

January
 January 2: Frank Buxton, American actor (voice of the title character in Batfink), dies at age 87.
 January 4: Ray Thomas, English multi-instrumentalist, flautist, singer and member of The Moody Blues (voiced himself in The Simpsons episode "Viva Ned Flanders"), dies at age 76.
 January 7: Doug Young, American actor (voice of Doggie Daddy in The Quick Draw McGraw Show, Ding-A-Ling Wolf in The Huckleberry Hound Show, Yippee in The Peter Potamus Show), dies at age 98.
 January 27: Jim McLean, American animator and storyboard artist (Warner Bros. Animation, Disney Television Animation, He-Man and the Masters of the Universe, Denver, the Last Dinosaur, BraveStarr, Spider-Man), dies at age 67.
 January 31: 
 Cav Bøgelund, Danish animator and comics artist (Våbenbrødre), drowns at age 39 in mysterious circumstances.
 Ann Gillis, American actress (voice of Faline in Bambi), dies at age 90.

February
 February 2: Servais Tiago, Portuguese comics artist and animator, dies at age 92.
 February 4: John Mahoney, English actor (voice of Preston Whitmore in Atlantis: The Lost Empire and Atlantis: Milo's Return, General Rogard in The Iron Giant, Papi in Kronk's New Groove, Robert Terwilliger in The Simpsons episode "Funeral for a Fiend"), dies at age 77.
 February 9: Reg E. Cathey, American actor (voice of Captain Quaid in Rapunzel's Tangled Adventure), dies at age 59.
 February 24: Bud Luckey, American animator, composer (Walt Disney Animation Studios, Pixar, Sesame Street) and actor (voice of Rick Dicker in The Incredibles, Chuckles in Toy Story 3, Eeyore in Winnie the Pooh), dies at age 83.
 February 26: Benjamin Melniker, American film and television producer (Warner Bros. Animation, Where on Earth Is Carmen Sandiego?, Fish Police, Dinosaucers), dies at age 104.
 February 27: Bill Lignante, American comics artist, courtroom sketch artist and animator (Hanna-Barbera), dies at age 91.

March
 March 1: Pete Henderson, American comedian (voice of Monkeys in The Jungle Book), dies at age 79.
 March 3: David Ogden Stiers, American actor (voice of Cogsworth in Beauty and the Beast, Ratcliffe and Wiggins in Pocahontas, the Archdeacon in The Hunchback of Notre Dame, Jumba in the Lilo & Stitch franchise), dies at age 75.
 March 14: Stephen Hawking, English theoretical physicist, cosmologist and author (voiced himself in The Simpsons episodes "They Saved Lisa's Brain", "Don't Fear the Roofer", "Stop, Or My Dog Will Shoot!" and "Elementary School Musical", and the Futurama episodes "Anthology of Interest I", "The Beast with a Billion Backs" and "Reincarnation"), dies from ALS at age 76.
 March 15: Robert Grossman, American painter, caricaturist, sculptor, filmmaker, poster designer, comics artist, cartoonist and animator (Jimmy The C), dies at age 78.
 March 17: Mike MacDonald, French-born Canadian actor and comedian (voice of the Mouse King in The Nutcracker Prince, Rip in The Ripping Friends, Lifeguard in the Ren & Stimpy "Adult Party Cartoon" episode "Naked Beach Frenzy"), dies from heart complications at age 63.

April
 April 4: Soon-Tek Oh, Korean actor (voice of Zhou in Mulan), dies at age 85.
 April 5: Isao Takahata, Japanese animator, film director and producer (Grave of the Fireflies, The Tale of the Princess Kaguya), dies at age 82.
 April 8: Chuck McCann, American actor, comedian, puppeteer, and television host (voice of Duckworth, Burger Beagle and Bouncer Beagle in DuckTales, The Thing in Fantastic Four and The Incredible Hulk, Blizzard in Iron Man, Heff Heffalump in The New Adventures of Winnie The Pooh, the Amoeba Boys in The Powerpuff Girls, "Moe" Mastro Giovanni in Adventure Time), dies at age 83.
 April 12: Giuliano Cenci, Italian film director (The Adventures of Pinocchio), dies at age 86.
 April 15: R. Lee Ermey, American actor and Marine drill instructor (voice of Sarge in the Toy Story franchise, Sky Marshall Sanchez in Roughnecks: Starship Troopers Chronicles, General Thorton in Big Guy and Rusty the Boy Robot, Colonel O'Malley in Recess: School's Out, Jack in Shark Bait, Wildcat in Batman: The Brave and the Bold, General Tsin in Kung Fu Panda: Legends of Awesomeness, Colonel Leslie Hapablap in The Simpsons episodes "Sideshow Bob's Last Gleaming" and "Waiting for Duffman", General Sims in the Kim Possible episodes "Day of the Snowmen" and "Rufus vs. Commodore Puddles", Sergeant Goonther in The Angry Beavers episode "Fancy Prance", Sergeant Hobo 678 in the Invader Zim episode "Hobo 13", Madison in the Rocket Power episode "Saving Lt. Ryan", Colonel Thrift in the Fillmore! episode "South of Friendship, North of Honor", Drill Sergeant in The Grim Adventures of Billy & Mandy episode "Here Thar Be Dwarves", Sarge in the My Life as a Teenage Robot episode "Last Action Zero", Bunny in the Father of the Pride episode "One Man's Meat Is Another Man's Girlfriend", Warden in the SpongeBob SquarePants episode "The Inmates of Summer"), dies from pneumonia at age 74.
 April 17: Carl Kasell, American radio personality (voiced himself in The Simpsons episode "Pay Pal"), dies from alzheimer's disease at age 84.
 April 23:
 Bob Dorough, American jazz musician, songwriter and composer (Schoolhouse Rock), dies at age 94.
 Arthur B. Rubinstein, American composer (Tiny Toon Adventures, The Simpsons), dies from cancer at age 80.
 April 24: Susan Shadburne, American screenwriter, director, producer, and filmmaker (Will Vinton Productions), dies at age 75.

May
 May 7: 
 Miki Muster, Slovenian sculptor, illustrator, comics artist and animator (Bavaria Film, made cartoons based on the work of Guillermo Mordillo and Manfred Schmidt's Nick Knatterton), dies at age 92.
 Søren Hyldgaard, Danish film composer (When Life Departs, Help! I'm a Fish), dies at age 55.
 May 11: Zlatko Bourek, Croatian animated film director, screenwriter, production designer and cartoonist, dies at age 88.
 May 13: Margot Kidder, Canadian-American actress (voice of Solitaire in GoBots: Battle of the Rock Lords, Mistress Helga in Aaahh!!! Real Monsters, continued voice of Gaia in Captain Planet and the Planeteers), dies at age 69.
 May 14: Tom Wolfe, American author and journalist (voiced himself in The Simpsons episode "Moe'N'a Lisa"), dies at age 88.
 May 16: Joseph Campanella, American actor (voice of the Lizard in Spider-Man, William Shepard / the Master in Road Rovers), dies at age 93.
 May 17: Jerry Richardson, American animator, storyboard artist, background artist, prop designer and art director (Bobby's World, The Simpsons, Klasky Csupo, Nickelodeon Animation Studio, Adelaide Productions, Futurama, Cartoon Network Studios, Disney Television Animation, Warner Bros. Animation, Brickleberry), dies at age 53.
 May 18: Fred Peters, American animator and comics artist (Walt Disney Company), dies at age 95.
 May 21: Clint Walker, American actor and singer (voice of Nick Nitro in Small Soldiers), dies at age 90.

June
 June 1: William Edward Phipps, American actor (voice of Prince Charming in Cinderella), dies at age 96.
 June 2: Nick Meglin, American comics writer, theatre lyricist and animation scriptwriter (Batfink, The Pink Panther), dies from a heart attack at age 82.
 June 8: Anthony Bourdain, American celebrity chef, author and travel documentarian (voice of Lance Casteau in the Archer episode "Live and Let Dine", voiced himself in The Simpsons episode "The Food Wife", and the Sanjay and Craig episode "Snake Parts Unknown"), commits suicide at age 61.
 June 11: Rumen Petkov, Bulgarian animator, comics artist (Choko & Boko) and director (Johnny Bravo, Dexter's Laboratory, Cow and Chicken, I Am Weasel, The New Woody Woodpecker Show), dies at age 70.
 June 14: José Castillo, Venezuelan animator (creator of Conejíto, the first animation in the history of Venezuela), dies at age 94.
 June 28: 
 Denis Akiyama, Japanese-Canadian actor (voice of Iceman, Silver Samurai, and Sunfire in X-Men, Malachite in the original English dub of Sailor Moon), dies from cancer at age 66.
 Harlan Ellison, American screenwriter (Cadillacs and Dinosaurs, Silver Surfer, Love, Death & Robots, voiced himself in Scooby-Doo: Mystery Incorporated, and The Simpsons episode "Married to the Blob", additional voices in The Pirates of Dark Water), dies at age 84.
 June 29: Eugene Pitt, American musician (composed the theme music of Nickelodeon), dies at age 80.

July
 July 1: Peter Firmin, English animator, puppeteer and illustrator (co-creator of Noggin the Nog, Ivor the Engine and Bagpuss), co-founder of Smallfilms, dies at age 89.
 July 4: Darrell McNeil, American animator, writer, editor, publisher, producer and actor (Hanna-Barbera, Filmation, Bakshi Animation, Ruby-Spears, Walt Disney Company, Warner Bros. Animation, Don Bluth), dies at age 60.
 July 10: Lolee Aries, American television producer and production manager (Film Roman, Nickelodeon Animation Studio, MoonScoop), dies from complications of lymphoma at age 61.
 July 19:
 Claude Viseur, aka Clovis, Belgian comic artist and animator (Belvision), dies at age 71 or 72.
 Jon Schnepp, American animator and television director (Space Ghost Coast to Coast, Aqua Teen Hunger Force, Metalocalypse, The Venture Bros.), dies from a stroke at age 51.
 July 21: Elmarie Wendel, American actress and singer (voice of Aunt Grizelda in The Lorax, Beverley Billingsley in the American Dad episode "Stanny Boy and Frantastic"), dies at age 89.
 July 25: Patrick Williams, American composer, arranger and conductor (The Simpsons), dies from cancer at age 79.

August
 August 5: 
Charlotte Rae, American actress, comedienne and singer (voice of Aunt Pristine Figg in Tom and Jerry: The Movie, Adrienne Van Leydon in Itsy Bitsy Spider, Nanny in 101 Dalmatians: The Series), dies at age 92.
David Landsberg, American actor (voice of Woody in The Buford Files, Mr. Griff in Stanley), dies at age 73.
 August 13: Unsho Ishizuka, Japanese voice actor (voice of Jet Black in Cowboy Bebop, Mr. Satan in the Dragon Ball franchise, Van Hohenheim in Fullmetal Alchemist: Brotherhood, Zabuza Momochi in Naruto, Joseph Joestar in JoJo's Bizarre Adventure: Stardust Crusaders, narrator and Professor Oak in Pokemon), dies at age 67.
 August 15: Kunihiro Abe, Japanese animator (Gundam), dies at age 59 or 60.
 August 20: Brian Murray, South African actor and theatre director (voice of Long John Silver in Treasure Planet), dies at age 80.
 August 21: Stefán Karl Stefánsson, Icelandic actor and singer (portrayed Robbie Rotten in LazyTown), dies from bile duct cancer at age 43.
 August 23: Russ Heath, American comic book artist and animator (G.I. Joe: A Real American Hero), dies at age 91 from cancer.
 August 24: Robin Leach, English entertainment reporter and writer (voice of TV Host in the Garfield and Friends episode "Fat and Furry", Chamberlain in the Happily Ever After: Fairy Tales for Every Child episode "The Empress' Nightingale", voiced himself in the Family Guy episode "Peter, Peter, Caviar Eater"), dies from a stroke at age 76.
 August 31: Carole Shelley, English actress (voice of Amelia Gabble in The Aristocats, Lady Kluck in Robin Hood), dies at age 79.

September
 September 6: Burt Reynolds, American actor (voice of Charlie B. Barkin in All Dogs Go to Heaven, Senator Buckingham in American Dad!, Judge Keaton in the Duckman episode "Das Sub", M.F. Thatherton in the King of the Hill episode "The Company Man"), dies at age 82.

October
 October 4:
 Will Vinton, American animator and film director (The Adventures of Mark Twain, The California Raisins), dies at age 70.
 Audrey Wells, American producer, director and screenwriter (Over the Moon), dies from cancer at age 58.
 October 7:
 Gibba, Italian animator and comics artist, dies at age 93.
 Michel Lyman, American animator (The Little Rascals Christmas Special, A Family Circus Christmas, A Chipmunk Christmas, The Mighty Kong), storyboard artist (DIC Entertainment), sheet timer (Film Roman, DIC Entertainment, Klasky Csupo, Nickelodeon Animation Studio, Hyperion Pictures, Adelaide Productions, All Dogs Go to Heaven: The Series, Mike, Lu & Og, Generation O!, Disney Television Animation, The Cramp Twins, Warner Bros. Animation, Stripperella, American Dad!, Cartoon Network Studios, LeapFrog, Brickleberry, Madea's Tough Love, Bordertown, Dawn of the Croods, She-Ra and the Princesses of Power, Guardians of the Galaxy), lip sync artist (Mike, Lu & Og, King of the Hill, Tron: Uprising, Guardians of the Galaxy), animatic editor (Adventure Time), production manager (The California Raisin Show), producer (The Legend of Prince Valiant) and director (The Legend of Prince Valiant, The Real Adventures of Jonny Quest, The Angry Beavers, Phantom 2040, C Bear and Jamal, The Grim Adventures of Billy & Mandy, Sym-Bionic Titan), dies at age 67.
 October 9: Adam Burke, American animator (Pixar), dies at age 47.
 October 15: Domingo Rivera, American animator and clean-up artist (Cats Don't Dance, Quest for Camelot, The Iron Giant, The Tigger Movie, Atlantis: The Lost Empire, Eight Crazy Nights, Sinbad: Legend of the Seven Seas, The Simpsons, The Simpsons Movie), dies at an unknown age.
 October 17: Robert J. Walsh, American composer (Looney Tunes, Marvel Productions), dies at age 70.
 October 27: Stephen Sustarsic, American television producer and writer (Disney Television Animation, Mighty Max, Exosquad, Bump in the Night, Duckman, Dilbert, Xiaolin Showdown, Danny Phantom, Loonatics Unleashed, World of Quest, Fanboy & Chum Chum, WordGirl, Johnny Test, Xiaolin Chronicles, co-creator of The Wild Thornberrys), dies at age 62.
 October 30: David Cherkassky, Soviet and Ukrainian animated film director and screenwriter (Kievnauchfilm), dies at age 87.

November
 November 4: Jacques Muller, French animator (Walt Disney Company, Warner Bros. Animation, Amblin, ILM), dies at age 62.
 November 5: Rick Reinert, American animator, film director and producer (MGM, Walt Disney Animation Studios, Rick Reinert Productions), dies at age 93.
 November 7: Orlando Corradi, Italian film animator and director (founder of Mondo TV), dies at age 78.
 November 13: Stan Lee, American comics writer, editor and publisher (narrator in The Incredible Hulk and Spider-Man and His Amazing Friends, voice of Fred's dad in Big Hero 6 and Big Hero 6: The Series, the Mayor of Superhero City in The Super Hero Squad Show, Mayor Stan in Hulk and the Agents of S.M.A.S.H., Stan the janitor in Ultimate Spider-Man, himself in Teen Titans Go! To the Movies, The Simpsons episodes "I Am Furious (Yellow)", "The Caper Chase" and "Married to the Blob", and the Spider-Man episode "Farewell Spider-Man"), dies at age 95.
 November 24: Ricky Jay, American stage magician, actor and writer (narrator in the Teen Titans Go! episode "Double Trouble", voiced himself in The Simpsons episode "The Great Simpsina"), dies at age 72.
 November 27: Stephen Hillenburg, American comics artist, animator, writer, producer, director, designer, storyboard artist, illustrator and actor (Rocko's Modern Life, creator of SpongeBob SquarePants), dies at age 57.

December
 December 1: Ken Berry, American actor, dancer and singer (voice of Seymour Grey in The New Batman Adventures episode "Never Fear"), dies at age 85.
 December 10: Alvin Epstein, American actor and director (voice of Bookseller in Beauty and the Beast), dies at age 93.
 December 17: Penny Marshall, American actress, film director and producer (voice of Laverne DeFazio in Laverne & Shirley in the Army, Ms. Botz in The Simpsons episode "Some Enchanted Evening"), dies at age 75. 
 December 27: Børge Ring, Danish animator, jazz musician and comics artist (Oh My Darling, Anna & Bella, Run of the Mill), dies at age 97.
 December 30: Don Lusk, American animator and director (Walt Disney Animation Studios, Peanuts, Hanna-Barbera), dies at age 105.

See also
 2018 in anime
 List of animated television series of 2018

References

External links 
Animated works of the year, listed in the IMDb

 
2010s in animation
Animation
Mass media timelines by year